The Weekend Warrior World Tour was the fifteenth headlining concert tour by American country music singer Brad Paisley, and was in support of his eleventh studio album Love and War (2017). It began on May 18, 2017, in Saratoga Springs, New York and finished on April 26, 2018, in Lincoln, Nebraska. The tour visited North America and Europe. "Weekend Warrior" derives from Paisley playing on weekends this tour.

Background and Band Against Cancer
The tour was first announced in May 2017. The 2018 leg was announced in November 2017.

For this tour Paisley has teamed up with the Sarah Cannon the Cancer Institute of HCA to "Band Against Cancer". At every show concert there will be onsite resources where concert goers can "askSARAH" (the institute's hotline) questions. At the show fans can purchase Paisley's album Love and War for $15, and as part of "get one, give one", when they buy a copy, they can send a copy to a cancer patient for an additional $15.

Opening acts

Chase Bryant 
Lindsay Ell 
Dustin Lynch

Setlist
This setlist is a representation of the Raleigh, NC show.
"Last Time for Everything"
"Old Alabama"
"Perfect Storm"
"Online"
"One Beer Can"
"Crushin' It"
"This Is Country Music"
"Love and War"
"American Saturday Night"
"Ticks"
"I'm Still a Guy"
"Celebrity"
"Then"
"She's Everything"
"River Bank"
"Grey Goose Chase"
"Waitin' on a Woman"
"When I Get Where I'm Going"
"Water"
"Whiskey Lullaby"
"I'm Gonna Miss Her (The Fishin' Song)"
"Mud on the Tires"
"Today"
Encore
"Alcohol"

Tour dates

References

Brad Paisley concert tours